The EF 100–300mm refers to three telephoto zoom lenses produced by Canon. They are of the EF lens mount that is compatible with the EOS line of cameras.

The three versions are:
5.6
5.6L
4.5–5.6 USM

The two 5.6 versions were contemporaries, launched at the beginning of the Canon EOS system. The L version had a different optical construction which improved sharpness, color, and chromatic aberrations. Otherwise the lenses were physically similar. Canon decided to upgrade the non-L version in the early 1990s to the 4.5-5.6 version, not the L. It had improved styling, a ring zoom control instead of push-pull, and a larger (faster) aperture at the wider end. It also made use of a much faster and much quieter Ultrasonic ("USM") motor for autofocus control, instead of the Arc-Form Drive ("AFD") found on the 5.6 lenses. The L version never received this upgrade, and it lasted long after the 5.6 non-L had been discontinued. Following Canon practice, the L lens was sold including its lens hood and protective case.

Lenses

References

External links

100-300mm